The Vienna U-Bahn, where U-Bahn is an abbreviation of the German term Untergrundbahn, is a rapid transit system serving Vienna, Austria. It is the backbone of one of the best performing public transport systems worldwide according to UITP (International Association of Public Transport) in June 2009. More than 1.3 million passengers rode the Vienna U-Bahn every day in 2009, and 567.6 million passengers used the U-Bahn in 2011, which declined to 428.8 million passengers in 2013. The network is undergoing expansion and rolling stock renewal. Since 1969, 200 million euros have been invested annually in the extension of the Vienna U-Bahn.

The modern U-Bahn opened on 25 February 1978 (after test operations began on 8 May 1976), but two of the lines extended and later designated as U-Bahn (U4, U6) date back to the Stadtbahn ("city railway") system, which opened in 1898. Parts of the U2 and U6 lines began as subway tunnels built to accommodate earlier tram lines. Only the U1 and U3 were built wholly as new subway lines.

Lines are designated by a number and the prefix "U" (for U-Bahn) and identified on station signage and related literature by a colour. There are five lines; U1, U2, U3, U4 and U6. Since the late 1960s there have been numerous suggestions of routings for a line U5, but all these projects had been shelved until the construction of a new U5 was announced in early 2014. Stations are often named after streets, public spaces or districts, and in some special cases after prominent buildings at or near the station, although the policy of the Wiener Linien states that they prefer not to name stations after buildings.

Local tickets are valid on S-Bahn suburban rail services and other train services but those are operated by the state railway operator, ÖBB. Tickets are not valid on bus services operated by Vienna Airport Lines and the City Airport Train express train.

U-Bahn network 
Further extensions of the Vienna U-Bahn are scheduled to be completed in the upcoming decade, finally creating the missing line U5. Some plans have been proposed for the system beyond 2027, when the U2/5 project gets completed, although such plans are currently unfunded.

U-Bahn services run between 05:00 and around 01:00 at intervals between two and five minutes during the day and up to eight after 20:00. Since 4 September 2010, there has been a 24-hour service operating at a 15-minute interval in the nights between Fridays–Saturdays, Saturdays–Sundays, and in the nights prior to a public holiday. The 24-hour U-Bahn is supplemented in these nights by Vienna NightLine bus services.

Stations

Map

History and projected expansions
Planning for an underground railway can be traced back to the 1840s. Since then, there have been numerous plans and concessions to build such a project, making Vienna the city with the most subway planning.

The concession request of the engineer Heinrich Sichrowsky dates from 1844 with the idea of an atmospheric railway based on the system of Medhurst and Clegg. The trains would have been advanced by means of air pumps stationarily stationary steam engines in a pneumatic manner. Sichrowskys route should lead from the Lobkowitzplatz below the Vienna Glacis on to the Wien River to Hütteldorf. Although such trains had been built in London and Paris, it found in Vienna no investors for its stock company, so this idea was rejected. The connecting railway project of Julius Pollak (1849) was also conceived as an atmospheric system.
Sichrowsky's request was the starting point for a series of plans that, however, were mostly not approved and could not be implemented. For example, in 1858 the city planner Ludwig Zettl proposed to make an overburden of the former moat instead of filling it, and then to set up a railroad tram in this enclosed ditch, which would bypass the city. This would have created a connection between the central station and the market halls, while at the same time the gas-lit tunnels were to serve as warehouses for food. By 1873, at least 25 planning for a municipal railway traffic came on, only the Verbindungsbahn, which already appeared in the much larger overall plan by Carl Ritter von Ghega in his project for Vienna's urban expansion of 1858, was later implemented as part of the mainline railway line. Incidentally, Ghega had already worked out a belt railway project along the line wall in 1845. The first planning for a subway in deep-seated tunnels by Emil Winkler dates back to 1873, in which it is also remarkable that the planning proposals were also based on the first systematic traffic census in Vienna.

Another wave of public transport projects were developed as the ring road was close to be finished. The conception of the British engineers James Bunton and Joseph Fogerty convinced, since their plans were approved in 1881, which included trains to be run in tunnels, in open incisions, and on elevated tracks.

In 1883, the project of an "electric secondary railway" of the company Siemens & Halske provided a small profile rail with three lines. The construction failed due to the concern of the city council, the inner city business life could be affected, especially since the project for the first time ever included a tunneling of the city center.

The first system to be constructed was a four-line Stadtbahn railway network (which had been planned to have three main and three local lines) using steam trains. Ground was broken in 1892, and the system was opened in stages between 11 May 1898 and 6 August 1901. At Hütteldorf, the Stadtbahn connected to railway service to the west, and at Heiligenstadt, to railway service on the Franz Josef Line, which then ran eastwards within the Austro-Hungarian Empire to Eger. Some of the Jugendstil stations for this system designed by Otto Wagner are still in use. However, the Stadtbahn proved inadequate for mass transport, less successful than the tramway. Starting in 1910, plans were considered for an underground system, but were interrupted by the First World War, which also necessitated closing the Stadtbahn to civilian use. After the war, the economic situation of a smaller and poorer country ruled out continuing with the plan. However, starting on 26 May 1924 the Stadtbahn was electrified, something that many had called for before the war, and from autumn 1925 it was integrated with the tramway rather than the railways. The frequency of trains tripled. Plans for a U-Bahn dating to 1912–14 were revived and discussions took place in 1929, but the Great Depression again necessitated abandoning planning.

Both in 1937 and after the Anschluß, when Vienna became the largest city by surface area in Nazi Germany, ambitious plans for a U-Bahn, and a new central railway station, were discussed. Test tunnelling took place, but these plans, too, had to be shelved when the Second World War broke out.

Severe war damage caused the Stadtbahn system to be suspended in some areas until 27 May 1945. The redevelopment of stations took until the 1950s. Meanwhile, Vienna was occupied by the four allied powers until 1955, and in 1946 had returned three quarters of the pre-war expanded Greater Vienna to the state of Lower Austria. Two proposals for U-Bahn systems were nonetheless presented, in 1953 and 1954. Increasing car traffic led to cutbacks in the S-Bahn network that were partially made up for by buses. The U-Bahn issue was also politicised: in the 1954 and 1959 city council elections, the conservative Austrian People's Party championed construction of a U-Bahn, but the more powerful Social Democratic Party of Austria campaigned for putting housing first. The city council repeatedly rejected the U-Bahn idea in the late 1950s and early 1960s.

Extensions of the Stadtbahn system had always been discussed as an alternative to building a new U-Bahn. But it was not until the late 1960s, when the Stadtbahn and the Schnellbahn were no longer able to adequately serve the ever-increasing public traffic, that the decision to build a new network was taken. On 26 January 1968, the city council voted to begin construction of a  basic network (Grundnetz). Construction began on 3 November 1969 on and under Karlsplatz, where three lines of the basic network were to meet, and where central control of the U-Bahn was located. Test operation began on 8 May 1976 on line U4, and the first newly constructed (underground) stretch of line opened on 25 February 1978 (five stations on U1 between Reumannplatz and Karlsplatz).

The construction of the Vienna U-Bahn network can be divided into several stages:

Initial construction (1969–1982): Basic network (Grundnetz) 

First, the basic network (Grundnetz) was chosen from the various network designs. During 1967, plans for the U2 were radically reduced and the U3 completely deleted, and the approved basic network was described as a 'closer basic network'. This closer basic network, consisting of the U1, U2 and U4 lines, included:

 New route between Reumannplatz and Praterstern
 U2 between Karlsplatz and Schottenring
 U4 between Hütteldorf and Heiligenstadt, consisting almost entirely of modification and adaptation of the existing Stadtbahn line

Construction began on 3 November 1969. On 25 February 1978, the first Vienna U-Bahn route between Karlsplatz and Reumannplatz, the U1, went into operation. With twelve partial commissionings, the Vienna U-Bahn basic network was completed on 3 September 1982.

Missing U5 
Placeholder line numbers were awarded during initial planning of the Vienna subway network between 1966 and 1973. The designation U5 was used in initial and later plans, but ultimately none of the segments with its numeration were approved for construction. In early expansion variant plans, the U5 would have run between Meidlinger Hauptstraße and St. Marx using the already partially-tunneled southern belt route. It later referred to the current branch of the line U2 from Schottenring to the stadium, which was planned to connect to a new segment to Hernals. , there is no U5 line; today's U2 line consists of parts of the previously planned U2 and U5, which are connected by an arc between the stations Rathaus and Schottentor (this was originally planned only as an operating track and is still the narrowest curve in the Vienna subway network). The designation U3 was for a long time a gap in the network, but there was already in the construction of the basic network preliminary work. Thus, the entire tunnel tube of the U3 between Naglergasse / Graben and Stubentor was completed during construction of the U1 (at Stephansplatz), in order to avoid further excavation work in the area of the cathedral.

Since 2003, several plans and internal working papers of Vienna have again been planning long-term plans for a U5 line, but only in early 2014 did they again make concrete efforts to actually realize the line. Finally, in March 2014, it was announced that the U5 line would be constructed in several stages of development as part of a U2 / U5 line cross.

Starting at Karlsplatz, the new line will use the existing U2 section, with a new section to be built from Rathaus station northwards. In the first expansion step, however, the line will be run until 2023, for the time being, only up to one stop on Frankhplatz in the area of the old AKH. The further construction in the 17th district is planned; However, the construction costs must first be negotiated with the federal government. (See: Fifth stage of the subway network).

The current U2 will then continue southwards in newly built tunnels: From Rathaus, it will connect with the U3 at Neubaugasse and the U4 at Pilgramgasse, continuing further south and connecting with the S-Bahn network at Matzleinsdorfer Platz. The financial resources for the construction come from the previously planned, but abandoned, southern extension of the U2 towards Gudrunstraße. The already approved expenditures by the federal government have not expired and could therefore be spent on these revised expansion plans.

Proposed U7 
In some designs also a line U7 was provided, which should connect the Floridsdorf and Donaustadt districts Floridsdorf station, Kagran and Aspern east of the Danube running. However, due to insufficient urbanization, this project was not found to be meaningful and was never planned, as it would be possible to transport almost the same number of people by means of a much cheaper tram line, which is the replacement of tram line 26 east of Wagramer Straße, from there to the Ziegelhofstraße six stops further on its own track body, by the Gewerbepark Stadlau to the subway station Hausfeldstraße on the northern edge of Aspern was also reached.

Second expansion phase (1982–2000): Lines U3 and U6 

The second phase involved the expansion of the U3 and U6 lines (about ). The groundbreaking ceremony for this phase took place on 7 September 1983 on Pottendsdorfer Street at the Philadelphia Bridge and after six years, the central section of the U6 between Philadelphia Bridge and Heligenstadt/Friedensbrücke went into operation.

After completion of the basic network, the Vienna subway system was extended in 1989 to the line U6 with the route Heiligenstadt-Philadelphiabrücke. For the belt line, the last remaining line of the light rail, had been modernized and converted to legal traffic. In order to preserve the valuable building fabric, the line was not rebuilt for operation with the underground railcars of the other lines; tram or metro-like trains with overhead power lines were used. In 1996, the U6 was extended in the north to Floridsdorf and the previous terminus Heiligenstadt (U4) is no longer approached. The two remaining, abandoned links of the former light rail are like much of the U6 listed building and are now partly used as a bike path.

In 1991, the completely newly built line U3 between Erdberg and Volkstheater was opened, which crosses the first district after the U1 as a second line. The western terminus Ottakring was reached in 1998, the southeastern end of the U3 is since the year 2000 in the station Simmering.

Third expansion phase (2001–2010): The first extensions of U1 and U2 

In 1996, a new U-Bahn contract, known as the "30 billion package", was settled. For the first time in Europe, a U-Bahn project had to undergo a costly and lengthy environmental impact assessment, as the U2 extension showed a length of more than ). This expansion phase involved:

U1 extension to Leopoldau
On 19 October 2001, the groundbreaking ceremony for the extension of U1 was held, for which the two districts had been waiting for 20 years.

U2 extension from Schottenring to Stadium
On 12 June 2003, the groundbreaking ceremony took place outside the Stadion (stadium). Because of the 2008 European Football Championships in Austria, there was enormous pressure to complete the construction on time. The Wiener Linien met the deadline, and on 10 May 2008 the U2 extension to the stadium was opened.

U2 extension from Stadium to Aspern
On 2 October 2010, a further six stations were opened taking the U2 across the Danube via Donaustadtbrücke to Aspernstraße in the twenty-second district (Donaustadt). An additional , three-station extension of the U2 to Aspern Seestadt was officially opened on 5 October 2013.

Fourth expansion phase (since 2010): Further extension of the Vienna U-Bahn 

Planning for a fourth U-Bahn expansion phase began in 2001 and concrete ideas were put forth in the 2003 Transport Master Plan. In 2007, there are plans for the extensions in Vienna, this provided the necessary extensions:
The extended U2 from Aspernstraße to Seestadt Aspern (then time horizon 2013)
The extended U1 from Reumannplatz to Rothneusiedl (then time horizon 2015)
The extended U2 from Karlsplatz to Gudrunstraße (then time horizon 2019)

2012 package
In March 2012, it was officially announced that the southern branch of U1 would instead be extended to Oberlaa and not the originally planned Rothneusiedl. This was achieved by expanding the pre-existing route of tram line 67. The change to the original plans was thought to be due cost issues or the incomplete development of the area surrounding Rothneusiedl. In the area of the station Alaudagasse preparations for a future line bifurcation were made, should the further development in Rothneusiedl warrant a branch line there.

2014 package
The originally planned southern extension of U2 to Gudrunstraße indefinitely delayed for financial reasons and since the need suggested is no longer there. With the budgeted funds, the so-called line cross U2 / U5 will be created instead. The line U2 coming from Seestadt and Schottentor will receive a new south branch, leading to the S-Bahn station Matzleinsdorfer Platz. The remaining route of the U2 between Karlsplatz and Universitätsstraße will be taken over by a newly created U5 line, which will be supplemented by the station Frankhplatz (Altes AKH) for the time being. This line should also lead a fully automatic operation, as currently used at the Nuremberg U-Bahn. The U5 line will be Vienna's first driverless U-Bahn line. Start of construction for the resulting crossroads is scheduled for 2018, 2024 (U5), and 2026 (U2) respectively.

Fifth expansion phase: Extension of U2 and U5 

It is planned to extend the U2 line from Matzleinsdorfer Platz to Wienerberg and to extend the U5 from Frankhplatz to Elterleinplatz. One further possibility is to build a second southern branch of the U1, which would terminate in Rothneusiedl.

Timeline

Rolling stock 
The Vienna U-Bahn has three types of rolling stock, and has permanent way equipment. The U1, U2, U3, and U4 have two types of rolling stock: the older U/U1/U2 type (introduced in 1972) and the newer V type (introduced in 2002). The U6 has one class of train, the T/T1 type (introduced in 1993), the older E6/C6 having been retired in 2008 and now mostly operating in Utrecht in the Netherlands and Kraków in Poland, with a single set being preserved at Vienna's tramway museum ("Remise").

U/U11/U2 class

The first cars of the type U, developed by Simmering-Graz-Pauker (SGP) were delivered in 1972. A train is made up of three double cars. By 2008, short-haul trains with two double-wagons were used during downtimes or on the U2 line. Technically, the cars are very similar to the Munich and Nuremberg subway trains. However, there are significant differences in the award-winning car design. By 1982, a total of 135 double railcars Type U were delivered, but are now retired.

From 1987 SGP supplied with the type U1 (later referred to as U11), a second generation, which looks like its predecessor outwardly. The technical equipment has been further developed and includes water-cooled three-phase motors, brakes with energy recovery and modernized emergency braking and safety equipment. In the years 2000 to 2010 trains of the later type series of the type U were rebuilt and equipped with new three-phase motors, which should extend their life for another 20 years. The converted trains are called Type U2. These vehicles operate on the lines U2 and U3.

The interior of a car consists of eight pairs of vis-à-vis seats in the middle section, nine seats on the driverless ends and two pairs of seats opposite each other in the opposite end of the car. In 2006, the U1 and U2 LED displays replaced the original in-and-out illuminated telltale displays. In addition, the trains will gradually be retrofitted with plastic seats, video surveillance and warning lights to signal the door closing operation. At Type U, no such conversions are made because the vehicles are successively scanned. An individual railcar has 49 seats and 91 standing places. In a train consisting of three double railcars, this is 294 seats and 546 standing places. The design of the "Silver Arrows" trimmings comes from the railway designer Johann Benda.

V-Cars: Newer Generation
In the late 1990s, a consortium of companies Siemens, ELIN and Adtranz developed a new train called Type V or "V-Car". It is a continuous, permanently coupled six-car train consisting of two non-motorized control cars and four motorized intermediate cars. This corresponds to the length of three double wagons of the Ux type family. After a prototype had been mostly used on the line U3 from December 2000, 25 sets were purchased in June 2002 and again 15 trains of this type in December 2007. Of these, the first sets were delivered from February 2005, which received their operating license in mid-August 2006 after several delays. At the end of September 2009, another 20 vehicles were ordered.

In contrast to the prototype, the production cars in the interior were adapted to the new standard and got gray instead of white sidewalls and red plastic seats instead of the originally installed fabric seats. The newer Type V lines also feature yellow instead of gray-red handrails, improved interior displays and warning lights to signal the door closing operation. A car consists of eight pairs of Vis-à-vis seats in the middle section and six seats each at the car transitions. At the beginning and end of the trains there are multipurpose compartments with four folding seats each and automatically extending ramps at each station to close the platform gap. They are the first Vienna subway cars to have air conditioning and are factory-equipped with video surveillance. In order to keep the station stays short and avoid blocking by passengers, the doors have only sensitive sensor edges as anti-trap instead of light barriers. An individually opened door therefore only closes again as part of a central closing operation. All entrances can also be opened centrally from the driver's seat.

The trains were equipped with extensive safety technology, such as fire detectors in the roof areas, temperature sensors and dry extinguishing pipes on the undercarriage. Smoke or temperature exceedances are immediately transmitted to the driver. The type V cars have 260 seats and 618 standing places. The exterior design is the responsibility of Porsche Design.

A similar variant of this Type is also in service in Oslo, Norway as type OS MX3000.

X-Cars 
Siemens was contracted to deliver and maintain 34 6-car Type X trains in September 2017. The order includes an option for an additional eleven trains. The vehicles are suited for both fully automated operation and driver operation. They will be used on the future Line U5 in a driverless configuration, and will serve on Lines U1 to U4 with drivers. Delivery started in spring of 2020 with a pre-series vehicle, with the last trains in this order scheduled for delivery at the end of 2030.

Line U6
The Line U6 was originally slated for rapid transit conversation like Line U4. However taking into account historic preservation of original Vienna Stadtbahn stations and structures, construction costs and disruption of existing services, decided to keep Line U6 with much of its original operations. Today Line U6 is unique when compared to other U-Bahn lines with overhead lines, low floor LRVs and optical signals (no LZB).

T-Class
A set consists of three permanently coupled cars, a train of four sets. By 2008, short-cut trains from three sets also operated during off-peak hours. The T-cars drove initially in conjunction with the older E6 / c6 cars, so that each train was a low-floor car, today only trains made entirely from T- and T1-cars. Seats: 232, standing room: 544.

A video-monitored, equipped with air conditioning, electronic interior and exterior displays and new design further development of the Type T comes since May 2008 as Type T1 used and replaced the old E6 / c6 high-floor suits. Since 24 December 2008 only vehicles type T and T1 on the U6.

The T and T1 cars can be coupled with each other so that trains from T and T1 cars can run mixed.

At the end of 2009, the T-cars began to be equipped with electronic indoor and outdoor displays and to improve the safety of passengers, personnel and against vandalism with a video surveillance of the interiors and thus visually align the T1. Also, the older cloth seats in the T-wagons are gradually being replaced by new, red plastic seats with yellow handles, which can also be found in the T1 car and in the Type V metro car. The vehicles of the Tx type family will also receive successive warning lights for signaling the door closing operation.

So that they can be transferred via the tram network to the main workshop of Wiener Linien, the T and T1 cars are equipped for tram operation.

Former Trains
An entire train offered 192 seats and 432 standing places. Until the end of 2008, the trains still operated in conjunction with T-cars, i.e. E6 + c6 + T + c6 + E6. In May 2008, the delivery of the type T1 began, which should completely replace the type E6 / c6. On 23 December 2008 E6 / c6 cars ran for the last time on the U6. Most of the vehicles were sold to Utrecht or Krakow. A train consisting of a railcar and a sidecar is obtained in the Museum of Remise. The E6 and c6 in Utrecht were sold to Krakow in 2014.

Art

In common with many urban transit systems, the Vienna U-Bahn has art works in stations. These include:

 Aspern Nord: Aspern Affairs, two big artistic maps of Vienna at the end of the platform, one showing the situation in 1809 during the Napoleonic Wars and one of 1912, where the airport in Aspern (at the time the biggest airport in Europe) can be seen. Also there are colored "lifelines" above the tracks that show the names of famous people, and the dates of their birth and death. The artworks were created by Stephan Huber.
 Erdberg: Mosaics Stadteinwärts and Stadtauswärts by Peter Atanasov
 Hütteldorfer Straße: U-BauAlphabet by Georg Salner
 Johnstraße: übertragung by Michael Schneider
 Karlsplatz: Pi by Ken Lum
 Karlsplatz: Spatial installation by Peter Kogler
 Karlsplatz: Frieze Unisono di colori by Ernst Friedrich und Eleonor Friedrich
 Landstraße: Enamel wall by Oswald Oberhuber
 Landstraße: Installation Planet der Pendler mit den drei Zeitmonden by Kurt Hofstetter
 Laurenzgasse: Mural by Heimo Zobernig
 Museumsquartier: Lauf der Geschöpfe, Der Jubilierende, Wächter, Lebenskeim and Tor des Verborgenen by Rudi Wach
 Ottakring: U-Turn by Margot Pilz
 Ottakring: Graffiti wall by Wiener Graffiti Union
 Praterstern: Einen Traum träumen und ihn mit anderen teilen ... by Susanne Zemrosser 
 Schottentor: varying installations in glass case
 Schweglerstraße: Kunst der Technik by Nam June Paik 
 Stadlau: Nepomuk by Werner Feiersinger
 Stubentor: Bewegungen der Seele by Michael Hedwig
 Südtiroler Platz – Hauptbahnhof: SUED by Franz Graf
 Taborstraße: ein Garten (zum Beispiel) by Ingeborg Strobl
 Volkstheater: Das Werden der Natur by Anton Lehmden
 Westbahnhof: Cirka 55 Schritte durch Europa by Adolf Frohner
 Zippererstraße: Kid's Kunst – Mobilität im kommenden Jahrtausend (children's art)
 Rochusgasse: Roman archaeological remains

See also 
 Transportation in Vienna
 Vienna S-Bahn
 Trams in Vienna
 List of metro systems
 Wiener Lokalbahnen

References

Inline references

Books
German
Johann Hödl: Das Wiener U-Bahn Netz, Wiener Linien, 2009
Johann Walter Hinkel: U-Bahnen von 1863 bis 2010, N.J. Schmid Verlagsgesellschaft, 2004

External links 

 
 Vienna Metro German/English

 
Rapid transit in Austria
Rail transport in Vienna
750 V DC railway electrification
Transport in Vienna
1978 establishments in Austria
Railway lines opened in 1978